Dirk Dirksen (August 25, 1937 – November 20, 2006) was a music promoter and emcee of the San Francisco punk rock clubs Mabuhay Gardens and On Broadway in the late 1970s and early 1980s. Dirksen was nicknamed the "Pope of Punk."

Dirksen was born in Braunschweig, Germany and immigrated to the US in 1948. He was a nephew of United States Senator Everett Dirksen. He served in the Army, briefly attended San Jose State University, and entered the entertainment business in the late 1950s, hosting a live television show called Rocket to Stardom. He then worked as a tour manager for several 1960s rock and soul acts. In 1974, he began to book acts at the Mabuhay Gardens in San Francisco's North Beach, and began booking local punk acts (The Nuns, The Sheets, Crime, Mary Monday, etc.) along with soon-to-be-famous national and international talent, such as Blondie, The Ramones, Devo, Black Flag, and The Dead Kennedys. From 1979 to 1982, he wrote and directed Amapola Presents Show, a weekly magazine–variety show on KEMO-TV, Channel 20. The show starred Filipina superstar Amapola with co-host Ness Aquino—Mabuhay Gardens' owner. Amapola Presents Show became Dirk Dirksen's showcase for local punk acts, local Bay Area bands and artists, and a group of Bay Area actors called "The Straight People." Dirksen gained some negative notoriety for allegedly ripping off SoCal punk rock bands Youth Brigade and Social Distortion while on their independent summer 1982 tour, and further taunting them by giving them rolls of pennies, as documented in the documentary Another State of Mind.

After leaving the Mabuhay Gardens, he operated the On Broadway nightclub just upstairs from the Mabuhay. When the On Broadway was closed in 1984, Dirksen went into video production with his firm, Dirksen-Molloy Productions, which he owned with his domestic partner Damon Molloy.

Dirksen was also active with the organization H.E.A.R. (Hearing Education and Awareness for Rockers).

In April 2006, he hosted a Mabuhay reunion event at the Fillmore Auditorium, featuring members of the Dead Kennedys, The Mutants, Flipper, and The Contractions. Later that year, he died in his sleep of an apparent heart attack at age 69.

On November 12, 2008, an official measure was passed to rename Rowland Alley — on Broadway between Kearney and Montgomery — for him.  In 2009, along with a street sign reading "Dirk Dirksen Place," a plaque was placed at 433 Broadway, the former site of the Mabuhay Gardens nightclub Dirksen once managed.

References

External links
Dirk Dirksen, the Pope of Punk by Frank Moore, 1995.
Dirksen-Molloy Productions

German emigrants to the United States
Music promoters
LGBT people from California
1937 births
2006 deaths
Businesspeople from California
20th-century American businesspeople
20th-century American LGBT people
21st-century LGBT people